Grace Maher (born 18 April 1999) is an Australian football player who currently plays for Canberra United in the Australian A-League Women, and KR in the Úrvalsdeild kvenna in Iceland. She previously played for Melbourne Victory.

Club career
In 2014, at the age of 15 Maher signed with Canberra United in the Australian W-League . At the time she was the youngest player to ever sign with a W-League team. She was in the starting lineup for the 2014 Grand Final, helping Canberra defeat Perth 3–1. In four seasons at Canberra, Maher made 28 appearances and scored 5 goals.

Maher signed with Melbourne Victory for the 2018–19 W-League season.

In September 2020, after two seasons with Melbourne Victory, Maher returned to Canberra United.

International
Maher has played for the Young Matildas, and was called up to the Australia women's national team for a training camp in Australia ahead of the 2017 Algarve Cup.

Honors
Canberra United
 W-League Championship: 2014
 W-League Premiership: 2016–17

References

External links 
 
 

1999 births
Living people
Australian women's soccer players
Women's association football midfielders
Canberra United FC players
Melbourne Victory FC (A-League Women) players
A-League Women players
People from Dubbo
Sportswomen from New South Wales
Soccer players from New South Wales